The Lynx Express was a long-distance passenger train in the South Island of New Zealand that ran the length of the Main North Line between Picton and Christchurch. The service was operated by New Zealand Rail Limited business unit InterCity Rail.

Operation
New Zealand Rail began The Lynx fast ferry service as part of the Interisland Line at the end of 1994, with the 74-metre Incat catamaran  being leased for that summer from Condor Ferries.

To complement the faster ferry, a passenger train from Picton to Christchurch and return was introduced. Named the Lynx Express, it debuted on Monday, 19 December 1994 and unlike the Coastal Pacific it ran beyond Picton railway station to and from the ferry terminal. The Coastal Pacific Express connecting with the conventional ferries ran from Christchurch to Picton and back.

Two cars from the original Southerner later used on the Northerner were rebuilt to the same specification as the new TranzAlpine cars. They each seated 50 passengers in seats designed for the Wairarapa Connection and Northerner/Overlander, featuring alcove-style seating with tables along with panoramic windows and air conditioning. These cars were complemented by the then-recently refurbished former Southerner, later Northerner, and an InterCity spare buffet car with 24 seats and tables, arranged alcove style, and a Daewoo modular former Auckland suburban van converted to a power and baggage van with a new 90 kW generator.

Despite the improved accommodation on the newer train, as opposed to the Coastal Pacific, and its faster timetable with only two intermediate stops at Blenheim and Kaikoura, the service failed to attract sufficient revenue, and when the Condor 10 returned from 1995 to 1996, the service was not resumed.

Accident 
On 23 December 1994, just a few days after its introduction, the Picton bound Lynx Express was involved in accident at a level crossing with State Highway 1 north of Omihi. A car illegally tried to cross in front of the train and was struck, resulting in the death of one of the car’s occupants. The car’s driver and another occupant suffered serious injuries.

See also
 Coastal Pacific

References

Citations

Bibliography

 

Long-distance passenger trains in New Zealand
Rail transport in Canterbury, New Zealand
Rail transport in the Marlborough Region
Railway services introduced in 1994
Named passenger trains of New Zealand
Railway services discontinued in 1995
Cook Strait Ferry
1994 establishments in New Zealand
1995 disestablishments in New Zealand
Discontinued railway services in New Zealand